Dale Stevenson (born December 8, 1987 in Raymond, Alberta) is a Canadian football fullback who is currently a free agent. He played college football with the Alberta Golden Bears. Playing both sides of the ball, Stevenson spent five years at the University of Alberta at both fullback and defensive end. Dale recorded a career total 20 receptions for 235 yards and one touchdown and three carries for eight yards in 20 games at fullback. His senior year, Dale recorded 30 defensive tackles (24 solo), a Canada West-leading six quarterback sacks and one pass knockdown as a starter for the Bears' defensive line. He played in the 2009 East-West Bowl. He signed as an undrafted free agent with the Eskimos in May 2011.

References

External links
Edmonton Eskimos player bio

1987 births
Living people
Alberta Golden Bears football players
Canadian football offensive linemen
Edmonton Elks players
People from Raymond, Alberta